Dwars door Vlaanderen is a semi-classic road bicycle race in Belgium, held annually since 1945. The race starts in Roeselare and finishes in Waregem, both in West Flanders. Since 2017 the event is included in the UCI World Tour.

Held in late March, the event is part of the Flemish Cycling Week, which also includes E3 Harelbeke, Gent–Wevelgem and the Tour of Flanders. Traditionally Dwars door Vlaanderen was held four days after Milan–San Remo and a week and a half before the Tour of Flanders. As from 2018 the race moved up one week on the international calendar and is now contested on the Wednesday before the Tour of Flanders, Flanders' foremost cycling classic, held on Sunday.

Since 2012, a women's edition of Dwars door Vlaanderen is held on the same day as the men's race, starting and finishing on the same location, of approximately 130 kilometres distance. Both events are organized by Flanders Classics. In addition the Grand Prix de Waregem was formerly regarded as the Under 23 version of the race.

History

Dwars door België
The race was first run in 1945 from Sint-Truiden to Waregem and was named Dwars door België – a name it kept until 1999. Belgian cycling icon Rik Van Steenbergen won the inaugural race. From 1946 to 1964 the event was run as a stage race over two days – with the exception of 1948. The first stage started in Waregem and finished in the eastern Belgian provinces of Limburg or Liège; from which it returned to Waregem the next day. In 1948 and since 1965, it has been held as a one-day race. Two editions have been cancelled, in 1971 and during the COVID-19 pandemic.

Held in late March, the event traditionally marked the start of the Flemish Cycling Week, which also includes E3 Harelbeke, Gent–Wevelgem, the Three Days of De Panne, and the Tour of Flanders. Dwars door Vlaanderen was contested mid-week, four days after Italy's  monument race Milan–San Remo and a week and a half before the Tour of Flanders.

World Tour race
In 2000 the event was renamed Dwars door Vlaanderen and Roeselare became the new starting place. The race was included in the inaugural UCI Europe Tour in 2005, classified as a UCI 1.1 event, and from 2013 to 2016 as a 1.HC race. The 2016 edition nearly had to be cancelled as it was scheduled one day after the 2016 Brussels bombings, causing security alert to be raised to the highest level in all of Belgium. On the evening of the event, organizers decided to continue as planned and the Belgian authorities gave clearance on the day of the race. The race was won by Jens Debusschere.

The 2017 edition was promoted to the UCI World Tour, cycling's highest tier of professional races. In 2018 Dwars door Vlaanderen was moved one week later on the calendar, from a position mid-week after Milan–San Remo to the Wednesday before the Tour of Flanders. At the same time the course was scaled down from 200 km to 180 km in length, and the Oude Kwaremont and Paterberg climbs were cut from the race.

Route
Dwars door Vlaanderen is one of several cobbled races in Flanders during Spring classics season. The race starts in Roeselare and finishes in Waregem, for a total distance of ca. 180 km. The bulk of the course is set in the hilly Flemish Ardennes.

The first 80 km in West Flanders are mainly flat, after which the course becomes more selective with a dozen climbs in the hill zone in East Flanders. Despite annual changes, some of the regular climbs in the race are the Taaienberg, Kruisberg and Côte de Trieu. The top of the last climb, Nokereberg, comes at 11 km from the finish. Additionally, there are several flat stretches of cobbles. Due to its hilly course in the Flemish Ardennes, the race is similar in nature to the Tour of Flanders, and is often used in preparation for the bigger event four days later.

Winners

Source: www.dwarsdoorvlaanderen.be

Multiple winners
Riders in bold are active

Wins per country

Women's race winners

Multiple winners
Riders in italics are active

Wins per country

References

External links
 

 
Classic cycle races
UCI World Tour races
UCI Europe Tour races
Cycle races in Belgium
Recurring sporting events established in 1945
1945 establishments in Belgium
Annual sporting events in Belgium
Spring (season) events in Belgium